Scopula sordida is a moth of the  family Geometridae. It is found in India (the Nilgiri Hills). Description of the moth was given by W. Warren in 1895. No subspecies are mentioned.

References

Moths described in 1895
sordida
Moths of Asia